Batocera oceanica is a species of beetle in the family Cerambycidae. It was described by Schwarzer in 1914. It is known from the Western Carolines.

References

Batocerini
Beetles described in 1914